The French Democratic Confederation of Labour (CFDT) is a national trade union center, one of the five major French confederations of trade unions, led since 2012 by Laurent Berger. It is the largest French trade union confederation by number of members (875,000) but comes only second after the General Confederation of Labour in voting results for representative bodies.

History 
The CFDT was created in 1964 when a majority of the members of the Christian trade union Confédération Française des Travailleurs Chrétiens (CFTC) decided they preferred to be part of a secular union. The minority kept the name CFTC.

At first, under the leadership of ), the CFDT presented itself as a social-democratic confederation close to the Unified Socialist Party (Parti socialiste unifié or PSU) which was led by Pierre Mendès-France. It sometimes acted in concert with the CGT, which was dominated by the Communist Party. This alliance took a part in the May 68 upheaval. Then, the CFDT was auto-gestionary.

In 1974, many PSU and CFDT members joined the Socialist Party (Parti socialiste or PS) led by François Mitterrand. With Michel Rocard at their helm, they formed an internal opposition called "the second left". They abandoned the auto-gestionary project and advocated aligning themselves with the European social-democracy model. At the same time, under the leadership of Edmond Maire, the CFDT cut its ties with the CGT.

In the 1980s, after François Mitterrand's election and his choice to follow Socialist economic policies, the CFDT appeared to be a pro-governmental organization. During this time a lot of members and voters were lost. In the 1990s, under the leadership of Nicole Notat, the CFDT chose to distance its strategy from the PS. In this, it supported Alain Juppé's plan of Welfare State reform. It replaced Force ouvrière (FO) as the "main partner" of employers and right-wing governments, and the presidency of social security offices.

In 2003, the support of the new CFDT leader François Chérèque for pensions reform plans caused an internal crisis. Some CFDT members left the confederation and chose the CGT or the autonomous trade unions SUD. However, the CFDT participated with the other confederations to the 2006 conflict about the Contrat première embauche (CPE).

Professional elections
The CFDT won 21.81% of the vote in the employee's college during the 2008 professional elections, making it the second largest trade union in terms of votes in those elections. This result, however, is below the CFDT's 25.23% result in 2002 and its top result to date, 25.35% in 1997.

Affiliates

Current
The following federations are affiliated:

Other affiliates are:
 CFDT Executives (UCC CFDT)
 Confederate Union of Retired Persons (UCR CFDT)
 Union of Public Service and Similar Federations (UFFA)

Former

Leadership

General Secretaries
1964: Eugène Descamps
1971: Edmond Maire
1988: Jean Kaspar
1992: Nicole Notat
2002: François Chérèque
2012: Laurent Berger

Presidents
1964: Georges Levard
1967: André Jeanson
1971: Laurent Lucas
1973: Post abolished

Notable members
 Edmond Maire
 François Chérèque
 Nicole Notat
 Pierre Rosanvallon

References

European Trade Union Confederation
National trade union centers of France
1964 establishments in France
Trade unions established in 1964